Parmeshwor Sah Sudi (or Parmeshwar Sah Sudi) is a Nepalese politician who is elected member of Provincial Assembly of Madhesh Province from Loktantrik Samajbadi Party, Nepal. Shah, a resident of Janakpur was elected in the 2017 Nepalese provincial elections, from Dhanusha 3(B).

Electoral history

2017 Nepalese provincial elections

References

External links

Living people
Madhesi people
Members of the Provincial Assembly of Madhesh Province
People from Janakpur
Loktantrik Samajwadi Party, Nepal politicians
1967 births